Fügenberg is a municipality in the Schwaz district in the Austrian state of Tyrol.

Tourism 
St. Pancras Church, built from 1494 to 1497 in the Gothic style, is worth visiting. The Fügen-Fügenberg Region has two ski regions: the Spieljoch and Hochfügen. Besides its importance as a winter sport centre, Hochfügen is also the base for numerous mountain hikes, for example, to the 2,506 m high Gilfert or the 2,762 m high Rastkogel.

It has two ski areas.

References

Cities and towns in Schwaz District